Giuseppe Cristiano Malgioglio (born 23 April 1945) is an Italian composer, singer-songwriter, showman and television personality.

Biography
Born in Ramacca, Catania, Malgioglio obtained his first contract with a record label, Durium, thanks to the efforts of Fabrizio De André. In 1974 he composed Iva Zanicchi's song "Ciao cara come stai?" ("Hi darling, How Are You?"), which won the Sanremo Music Festival. In 1975 he had his most significant success as songwriter with Mina's "L'importante è finire" ("What Matters Is to finish"). In the same period he became a collaborator of Roberto Carlos, dealing with the Italian lyrics of his songs. He composed songs for, among others, Adriano Celentano, Rita Pavone, Amanda Lear, Raffaella Carrà, Mónica Naranjo, Dori Ghezzi, Milva, Patty Pravo, Ornella Vanoni, Giuni Russo, Marcella Bella, Sylvie Vartan, Umberto Balsamo, Fred Bongusto, Pupo, Rosanna Fratello, Loretta Goggi, Franco Califano. Parallel to his activity as a composer, Malgioglio started a singing career, characterized by ironical songs, often rich in sexual innuendos; his main success as a singer-songwriter is the song "Sbucciami" ("Peel Me").

After a period spent in Latin America, Malgioglio returned to popularity in his country in the 2000s as a television personality. In 2017 and 2020 he competed in the reality television Grande Fratello VIP, the Italian adaptation of Celebrity Big Brother.

References

External links

 

 

1949 births
Living people
People from Ramacca
Italian male singer-songwriters
Italian pop singers
Italian LGBT singers
Italian LGBT songwriters
Italian gay musicians
Gay composers
Gay songwriters
Gay singers
Italian male composers
Italian television personalities
Musicians from the Province of Catania
Mass media people from Sicily
20th-century Italian LGBT people
21st-century Italian LGBT people